The 2011 GCC Games was the first multi-sport event for the Gulf Cooperation Council (GCC) countries. It was held in Bahrain, from 11 October to 22 October 2011. Around 1,500 sportspeople participated in 11 sports.

Sports
 Athletics
 Basketball
 Bowling
 Cycling
 Goalball
 Football (soccer)
 Volleyball
 Handball
 Equestrianism
 Table tennis
 Swimming

Medal standings

Media Coverage
The host broadcaster is Abu Dhabi Sports Channel.

Football

The Association football tournament at the 2011 Arab Gulf Games was held from 13 October to 22 October. All matches took place at Bahrain National Stadium in Riffa.

Competition

Group A

Matches

Group B

Matches

Semi-finals

Third-place match

Final

Final rankings

Scorers
 4 goals
  Ismail Abdul-Latif
 3 goals
  Samy Al Huseiny
 2 goals

  Fahad Hardan
  Bader Al-Khames
  Rabeaa Sefiani
  Fahad Salim

 1 goal

  Abdulwahab Al Malod
  Hussain Ali Baba
  Mohamed El Neel
  Abdulla Abdulhady
  Abdulla Al Mumary
  Ahmed Abdu
  Hatan Bahberi
  Abdulla Hassan
  Ahmed Shamroukh
  Khamis Ali

References
Bahrain To Host GCC Games. Time Out Bahrain. Retrieved on 2017-01-27.

External links
 The official site

2011 in Bahraini sport
2011 in multi-sport events
Gulf Cooperation Council
International sports competitions hosted by Bahrain
Multi-sport events in Bahrain